2017 World Series may refer to:

 2017 Major League Baseball World Series
 2017 Little League World Series (baseball)
 2017 Intermediate League World Series (baseball)
 2017 Junior League World Series (baseball)
 2017 Senior League World Series (baseball)
 2017 College World Series (baseball)
 2017 World Club Series (rugby league)
 2017 World Series of Boxing
 2017 World Series of Poker
 2017 Fast5 Netball World Series